Eilema flammea is a moth of the subfamily Arctiinae. It was described by Paul Mabille in 1885. It is found on Madagascar.

References

flammea
Moths described in 1885